Bandon Halt was a station on the 1847 London, Brighton and South Coast Railway extension from West Croydon to Epsom. It was situated between Waddon and Wallington stations in what is now the London Borough of Sutton, and opened on 11 June 1906 and closed 7 June 1914. It takes its name from the immediate area which is called Bandon Hill.

References

Further reading
 

Railway stations in Great Britain opened in 1906
Railway stations in Great Britain closed in 1914
Disused railway stations in the London Borough of Sutton
Former London, Brighton and South Coast Railway stations